The County Chairman is a 1935 American comedy film directed by John G. Blystone and starring Will Rogers, Evelyn Venable and Kent Taylor. It was produced and distributed by the Fox Film Corporation. It is based on the 1903 play of the same name by George Ade which had previously been adapted into a 1914 silent film The County Chairman.

Premise
A political party boss in Wyoming must decide to either do what's right and lose the election or do what's wrong and win it.

Cast

 Will Rogers as Jim Hackler
 Evelyn Venable as Lucy Rigby
 Kent Taylor as Ben Harvey
 Louise Dresser as Mrs. Rigby
 Mickey Rooney as Freckers
 Berton Churchill as Elias Rigby
 Frank Melton as Hy Cleaver
 Robert McWade as Tom Craden
 Russell Simpson as Vance Jimmison
 William V. Mong as 	Uncle Eck
 Jan Duggan as Abigail
 Gay Seabrook as 	Lorna Craden
 Charles Middleton as 	Riley Cleaver
 Erville Alderson as Wilson Prewitt
 Stepin Fetchit as 	Sass
 Carmencita Johnson as Schoolgirl 
 Marcia Mae Jones as Schoolgirl
 Francis Ford as	Cattle Rancher

Production

The railroad scenes were filmed on the Sierra Railroad in Tuolumne County, California.

References

External links

1935 films
1935 romantic comedy films
Films directed by John G. Blystone
American black-and-white films
American romantic comedy films
Fox Film films
1930s English-language films
1930s American films
Silent romantic comedy films